Aquatics at the 1973 Southeast Asian Peninsular Games included swimming, diving and water polo events. The three sports of aquatics were held at Toa Payoh Aquatic Sport Center in Singapore. Aquatics events was held between 2 September to 5 September.

Swimming
Men's events

Women's events

Diving

Water polo

Medal table

References

The times added come from Swimming World magazine

Southeast Asian Peninsular Games
1973
1973 Southeast Asian Peninsular Games